Centenary is one of seven districts in the Mashonaland Central province of Zimbabwe. The district's capital is the town of Centenary.

References

Districts of Mashonaland Central Province